Prime TV is a television channel which broadcasts in Sri Lanka. The channel is operated by the Independent Television Network Limited, which is a state governed television and radio broadcaster in Sri Lanka. The channel broadcasts content in the English language.

See also
List of television networks in Sri Lanka
Media in Sri Lanka
Independent Television Network Limited

References

Television stations in Sri Lanka
Companies of Sri Lanka